The United States Marine Corps/WBCA National Coach of the Year is an award given by the Women's Basketball Coaches Association to best women's basketball Head Coaches in college and high schools since 1983. From 2014, the award is named "The Pat Summitt Trophy" in honor of the legendary University of Tennessee Lady Vols head coach. The WBCA presents an award to the National Coach of the year in each of six divisions:
 NCAA Division I
 NCAA Division II
 NCAA Division III
 NAIA
 Two-Year College
 High School

Winners

Geno Auriemma is the recipient of the most WBCA awards with seven (1997, 2000, 2002, 2008, 2009, 2016, 2017), all of them while coaching the University of Connecticut.

Sylvia Hatchell is the only coach to receive the award in different categories: NAIA in 1986 with Francis Marion College and NCAA Division I in 2006 with the University of North Carolina.

Besides Hatchell, other two coaches have received the award with different schools: Jorja Hoehn (NCAA Division II) with Central Missouri State University (1983 and 1985) and University of California-Davis (1995), and Michael Landers (JC/CC) with Trinity Valley Community College (2004) and Baton Rouge Community College (2010).

See also
Women's Basketball Coaches Association

References

College basketball coach of the year awards in the United States